This is a list of episodes from the Australian  children's television series Bananas in Pyjamas.

Series overview

Original series

Revived series

Original series (1992-2001)

Series 1 (1992)

Series 2 (1992)

Series 3 (1994)

Series 4 (1996)

Series 5 (1999)

Series 6 (2001)

Specials

CGI Series 1 (2011)

CGI Series 2 (2012)

CGI Series 3 (2013)

References

Lists of Australian children's television series episodes